LiveSummit are an English electronic dance music group from Manchester, started in 2008 by Alex Matt. LiveSummit primarily focus on electronic dance music, trap music, drum and bass, dubstep, and similar, though they do play other musical styles. They have played with producers, DJs and musicians as DJ Fresh, John B, Mistabishi, Yoji, Kutski, The Panacea, Black Sun Empire, The Sect, Phace, Concord Dawn, Aphrodite as well being headliners at many big music festivals. They worked with different musicians and recording studio from around the World (Studios 301 (Australia), and studios (Germany), Star Delta (UK) and other). They have released albums on labels in Britain and the US.

FLY HIGH featuring AnnGree listed in the Beatport "10 Must Hear Bass & Drum Tracks". In 2013 a collaboration with the Australian band The Vangarde – D2F was number one on EDM chart ReverbNation. In 2014 year they recorded a two album Feel Evolution and presented symphony orchestra Sinfosynthetic Pt. I., and they brought themselves in the top of ReverbNation UK charts again.
The next album "Energy Machine" was released in 2016 followed by the single "Break Me (trap remix)", and in the spring of 2017 the band once again takes the top of the UK charts and gets 17 place in the World of EDM (according to the ReverbNation.)

Discography

Non-album tracks

Band members
Alex Matt – vocals, MC, synths, bass 
Alexander Freeman – synths, backing vocals
Demetri Bazz – guitars
Roman Fox – drums

References

External links
Website

British drum and bass music groups
Dubstep music groups
Electronica music groups
English dance music groups
English electronic rock musical groups
Musical groups from Manchester